Prince Wilhelm Karl Bernhard Hermann of Saxe-Weimar-Eisenach (21 December 1853 – 15 December 1924) was a member of the House of Saxe-Weimar-Eisenach.

Life 
Prince Wilhelm of Saxe-Weimar-Eisenach was born on 21 December 1853 in Stuttgart. He was the eldest son of the Prince Hermann of Saxe-Weimar-Eisenach and Princess Augusta of Württemberg (1826-1898). Prince Wilhelm also has had his own financial problems, and has been forced by the Grand Duke to live outside Weimar. Wilhelm is heir presumptive to the throne as the young Grand Duke Wilhelm Ernst is a widower. His wife, Karoline of Reuss died in January 1905.

Prince William had a problem with his eldest son. Prince Hermann morganatically married Wanda Paola Lottero on 5 September 1909 in London. Lottero was an Italian stage actress, and due to Hermann's rollicking lifestyle, the ducal family forced him to renounce his rights of succession to the Saxe-Weimar-Eisenach throne, as well as his royal status, title and prerogatives, granting him a lesser, noble title, Count Ostheim, along with a small allowance on the grounds that he stay out of the duchy. Prince Wilhelm also had a bad reputation. His behavior aroused the dissatisfaction of the head of the family. Prince Wilhelm fled to the United States in his youth, served as a riding master, clerk, book agent and even as a restaurant waiter in New York City, but was finally persuaded to return to Germany, marry his second cousin, and live on a small pension from the head of the house.

Marriage and family 
Prince Wilhelm married Gerta Princess of Ysenburg and Büdingen (1863-1945), daughter of Ferdinand Maximilian I, Prince of Ysenburg and Büdingen (1824-1903) and Auguste Marie Gertrude Princess of Hanau and Horowitz (1829-1887), on 11 April 1885 at Wächtersbach, Germany. Augusta Marie Gertrude was daughter of Frederick William, Elector of Hesse. Wilhelm and Gerta had three children:
 Prince Hermann of Saxe-Weimar-Eisenach (14 February 1886 – 6 June 1964)
 Prince Albrecht of Sachsen-Weimar-Eisenach (23 December 1886 - 9 September 1918), killed in action during World War I
 Princess Sophie of Saxe-Weimar-Eisenach (25 July 1888 - 18 September 1913)

Honours and arms

He received the following orders and decorations:
 : Grand Cross of the White Falcon, 1853
    Ernestine duchies: Grand Cross of the Saxe-Ernestine House Order, 1878
 : Cross of Honour of the House Order of Lippe, 1st Class
  Siam: Grand Cross of the White Elephant
 : Grand Cross of the Württemberg Crown, 1871

Ancestry

References

External links
 The New York Times, 27 November 2010
 Royal Musings Retrieved 28 August 2010
 Princess Sophie of Saxe-Weimar-Eisenach 
 The New York Times, 24 September 1913

House of Saxe-Weimar-Eisenach
Princes of Saxe-Weimar-Eisenach
Disinherited European royalty
1853 births
1924 deaths